For the results of the Chile national football team, see:
 Chile national football team results (1910–1959)
 Chile national football team results (1960–1979)
 Chile national football team results (1980–1999)
 Chile national football team results (2000–2019)
 Chile national football team results (2020–present)